Gnathaphanus is a genus of beetles in the family Carabidae, containing the following species:

 Gnathaphanus aridus Blackburn, 1892 
 Gnathaphanus froggatti (Macleay, 1888) 
 Gnathaphanus herbaceus Sloane, 1900 
 Gnathaphanus latus Sloane, 1900 
 Gnathaphanus licinoides Hope, 1842 
 Gnathaphanus melbournensis (Castelnau, 1867) 
 Gnathaphanus multipunctatus (Macleay, 1888) 
 Gnathaphanus philippensis (Chevrolat, 1841) 
 Gnathaphanus picipes (Macleay, 1864) 
 Gnathaphanus porcatulus (Macleay, 1888) 
 Gnathaphanus pulcher (Dejean, 1829) 
 Gnathaphanus punctifer (Castelnau, 1867) 
 Gnathaphanus riverinae Sloane, 1895 
 Gnathaphanus sexpunctatus (Macleay, 1888) 
 Gnathaphanus whitei Sloane, 1917

Parasites
In Australia, Gnathaphanus pulcher is parasitized by a species of mite, Eutarsopolipus pulcher Hajiqanbar & Seeman, 2021 which dwells under the elytra.

References

Harpalinae